Abbe Lane (born Abigail Francine Lassman) is an American singer and actress. Lane was known in the 1950s and 1960s for her revealing outfits and sultry style of performing. Her first marriage was as the fourth wife of Latin bandleader and musician Xavier Cugat, more than thirty years her senior.

Early years
Born Abigail Francine Lassman in 1932 to Jewish parents, Abbey and Grace Lassman, in Brooklyn, New York, Lane had a brother, Leonard. She began her career at the age of four as a child actress on Vitaphone and radio. She began dancing on Broadway in 1947 as a teenager. On Broadway, she portrayed "Bobo" in Oh Captain! (1958), starring Tony Randall.

Early in her career, Lane was billed as "Abbe Marshall", her adopted forename possibly in tribute to her father, who was known as "Abbey". Using that name, she appeared in the Broadway shows Barefoot Boy with Cheek (1947) and As the Girls Go (1948).

Acting and singing

Because of her work in Europe, Lane was known as an actress before she became recognized for her singing and dancing. She had a television program in Europe and made 21 films there early in her career.

In 1952, she married bandleader Xavier Cugat, more than 30 years her senior. During the 1950s and early 1960s she worked as a nightclub singer and was described in a 1963 magazine article as "the swingingest sexpot in show business." Cugat's influence was seen in her music, which favored Latin and rumba styles. In 1958 she starred opposite Tony Randall in the Broadway musical Oh, Captain! but her recording contract prevented her from appearing on the original cast album of the show. Eileen Rodgers performed her songs for the cast LP; Lane later recorded her songs on a solo album. 

Lane made several recordings for RCA Victor and Mercury. She worked with Tito Puente on the album Be Mine Tonight released in 1958. She appeared on talk shows with Cugat until 1963. In 1964, Lane and Cugat divorced. They had no children together during their marriage. Later that same year, Lane married businessman Perry Leff, with whom she had two sons, Steven and Andrew. They remained married until Leff's death in 2020, aged 93.

Lane attracted attention for her suggestive comments, such as "'Jayne Mansfield may turn boys into men, but I take them from there." She said she was considered "too sexy in Italy". Her costume for an appearance on the Jackie Gleason Show was considered too revealing and she was instructed to wear something else. She was a guest on the television shows of Red Skelton, Dean Martin and Jack Benny.

In the later 1960s Lane starred in several Italian films. She performed on television variety programs such as The Ed Sullivan Show, The Steve Allen Show, The Jack Paar Program, The Mike Douglas Show, The Hollywood Palace, The Joey Bishop Show, The Merv Griffin Show and The Tonight Show starring Johnny Carson from the 1950s into the 1970s. She played guest roles in Naked City, The Man From U.N.C.L.E., The Flying Nun, F Troop, The Brady Bunch, Hart to Hart, and Vega$. Her last movie appearance was in Twilight Zone: The Movie (1983) in the minor role of an airline stewardess.

Later years
In 1992, Lane wrote the semi-autobiographical novel But Where Is Love? which described the painful memories of a teenage girl married to an older man.
 
Lane received a star on the Hollywood Walk of Fame at 6381 Hollywood Boulevard for her contribution to television.

Discography

As leader
 Be Mine Tonight, with Tito Puente and His Orchestra (RCA Victor, 1957)
 The Lady in Red, with Sid Ramin's Orchestra (RCA Victor, 1958)
 Where There's a Man, with Sid Ramin and His Orchestra (RCA Victor, 1959)
 Abbe Lane with Xavier Cugat and His Orchestra (Mercury, 1961)
 The Many Sides of Abbe Lane (Mercury, 1964)
 Rainbows (Butterfly Records, 1980)
Compilation: Pan, Amor Y .... (RCA, 1981)

With Xavier Cugat and His Orchestra
 Dancetime with Xavier Cugat (RCA Victor, 1953)
 Meet Xavier Cugat and Abbe Lane (10" album, Philips, 1955)
 Ole! (Columbia, 1953)
 Cha Cha Cha (Columbia in western hemisphere and South Africa, Philips Records in Europe, 1955)

Filmography

Bibliography

References

External links

 

1930s births
Living people
American women singers
American film actresses
Jewish American actresses
Jewish American musicians
Jewish singers
Mercury Records artists
RCA Victor artists
Actresses from New York City
Singers from New York City
20th-century American actresses
Nightclub performers
21st-century American Jews
21st-century American women